Stony Creek is a  tributary of the Nottoway River in southeastern Virginia of the United States.  The creek is formed by the confluence of Butterwood Creek and White Oak Creek in Dinwiddie County, Virginia.

Course

Stony Creek flows east then south from the Butterwood-White Oak Creek confluence west of the town of Dinwiddie, Virginia.  It then flows east again south of Dinwiddie going under US 1 and I-85.  Stony Creek flows east and south to just north of VA 40 where it picks up a large tributary, Sappony Creek.  From here it flows a short distance east through Stony Creek, Virginia to its confluence with the Nottoway River.

Sources
Stony Creek is formed at the confluence of Butterwood Creek and White Oak Creek in Dinwiddie County, Virginia.  Butterwood Creek is actually longer than Stony Creek at 25 miles in length and arises near Wellville, Virginia at an elevation of nearly 400 feet amsl.  Butterwood Creek then flows east through swampy areas to join White Oak Creek.  White Oak Creek also arises at about 400 feet amsl and about a 1/2 mile east of Butterwood Creek near Wilsons, Virginia.  White Oak Creek then flows east to Colemans Lake and then takes a bend south to join Butterwood Creek.

Watershed
The watershed of Stony Creek is punctuated by swampy areas and narrow floodplains.  It starts in the Piedmont of Virginia and flows east and south through a small gorge to the Coastal Plain southeast of Dinwiddie, Virginia.  Once in the Coastal Plain it widens out and acquires a wide floodplain with fringing swamps.

River Modifications
Stony Creek does not have any named impoundments directly on its course.  However, a number of its tributaries contain impoundments.  These include Twin Lakes on Butterwood Creek, Winfields Millpond and Spiers Pond on Sappony Creek and Richardsons Pond on an unnamed tributary.  Stony Creek flows under eleven bridges from the Butterwood-White Oak Creek confluence to the Nottoway River.

Geology
Stony Creek flows from the Piedmont to the Coastal Plain of Virginia.  The forming confluence is at the edge of mafic and felsic rocks metavolcanic rocks and the Petersburg Granite.  Petersburg Granite underlies most of the course and once in the Coastal Plain, it flows a short distance through the Windsor Formation and then through alluvium to the Nottoway River.

See also
List of rivers of Virginia

References

USGS Geographic Names Information Service
USGS Hydrologic Unit Map - State of Virginia (1974)

Rivers of Virginia
Tributaries of Albemarle Sound